The International Society of Limnology (SIL) is an international scientific society that disseminates information among limnologists, those who study all aspects of inland waters, including their physics, chemistry, biology, geology, and management. It was founded by August Thienemann and Einar Naumann in 1922 as the International Association of Theoretical and Applied Limnology and Societas Internationalis Limnologiae.
 
It had about 2.800 members in 2008.  SIL celebrated its 100th anniversary at a meeting in Berlin, Germany in August 2022.

SIL publishes the following  scientific publications: 
 the journal Fundamental and Applied Limnology:Archiv für Hydrobiologie   ; prior to 2007, it was called Archiv für Hydrobiologie.
 Communications (Mitteilungen), irregular publication.
 Limnology in Developing Countries, a book series.
 Congress proceedings, until 2007, published  as Verhandlungen Internationale Vereinigung für theoretische und angewandte Limnologie.
 SIL has discontinued publication of the Verhandlungen and has replaced it with a peer-reviewed journal entitled Inland Waters. The new journal was launched at the 31st SIL Congress in Cape Town, 2010, with first publication in 2011. The journal is supported by the electronic submission and tracking system of the Freshwater Biological Association. Manuscripts will be published consecutively online (as accepted) and quarterly in paper format. Access to the electronic version is provided to all SIL members and subscribers.

Congresses

			1922	Germany
			1923	Austria
			1925	USSR
			1927	Italy
			1930	Hungary
			1932	Netherlands
			1934	Yugoslavia
			1937	France
			1939	Sweden
			1948	Switzerland
			1950	Belgium
			1953	Britain
			1956	Finland
			1959	Austria
			1962	United States
			1965	Poland
			1968	Israel
			1971	USSR
			1974	Canada
			1977	Denmark
			1980	Japan
			1983	France
			1987	New Zealand
			1989	Germany
			1992	Spain
			1995	Brazil
			1998	Ireland
			2001	Australia
			2004	Finland
			2007	Canada
(Above list from Jones, 2010)
			2010	South Africa
			2013	Hungary
			2016	Italy
			2018	China
			2021	South Korea
			2022	Germany

References

External links
 SIL official web site

Limnology
Earth sciences organizations
International scientific organizations
Hydrology organizations